The St. James' Episcopal Mission Church (also  St. Peter's Catholic Mission Church and Heritage Hall.) on Reynolds St. (Old Co. Hwy. 91) in Dubois, Idaho was built in 1904.  It is a gable-front Gothic Revival church. It was designed by architects Wayland and Fennell.  It was listed on the National Register of Historic Places in 1993.

In 2017, the building was renamed to the Heritage Hall Museum.

References

Churches on the National Register of Historic Places in Idaho
Gothic Revival architecture in Idaho
Churches completed in 1904
Clark County, Idaho
Museums in Clark County, Idaho